The War of the Worlds is an 1898 science fiction novel by H. G. Wells.

The War of the Worlds may also refer to:

Radio
 The War of the Worlds (1938 radio drama), a 1938 episode of Orson Welles's CBS Radio series The Mercury Theatre on the Air
 The War of the Worlds (1968 radio drama), a 1968 WKBW radio adaptation of the 1938 broadcast

Film 
 The War of the Worlds (1953 film), a film by Byron Haskin
 War of the Worlds (2005 film), a film by Steven Spielberg
 H.G. Wells' War of the Worlds (The Asylum film), a 2005 film
 H. G. Wells' The War of the Worlds (Pendragon Pictures film), a 2005 film

Television
 War of the Worlds (1988 TV series), the 1988 television sequel to the 1953 film
 "War of the Worlds", a two-part 2009 episode of Ben 10: Alien Force
 "War of the Worlds", a 2013 episode of American Experience
 The Challenge: War of the Worlds, the 33rd installment of the reality competition show airing in 2019
 The War of the Worlds (British TV series), a 2019 BBC adaptation
 War of the Worlds (2019 TV series), a 2019 Fox and Studio Canal adaptation

Video games
 War of the Worlds (video game), a 1982 video game by Tim Skelly of Cinematronics
 The War of the Worlds (1984 video game), a computer game by CRL
 Jeff Wayne's The War of the Worlds (1998 video game), a real-time strategy game for the PC
 Jeff Wayne's The War of the Worlds (1999 video game), a vehicular combat game for the PlayStation
 The War of the Worlds (2011 video game), an Xbox 360 game

Print works
 War of the Worlds: Global Dispatches, a 1996 anthology of stories
 War of the Worlds: New Millennium, a 2005 novel by Douglas Niles
 H. G. Wells' The War of the Worlds (comics), a 2006 graphic novel by Ian Edginton and D'Israeli

Music
 Jeff Wayne's Musical Version of The War of the Worlds, a 1978 concept album by Jeff Wayne
 Jeff Wayne's Musical Version of The War of the Worlds – The New Generation, a 2012 concept album by Jeff Wayne
War of the Worlds, Pt. 1, a 2018 album by Michael Romeo
War of the Worlds, Pt. 2, a 2022 album by Michael Romeo
 War of the Worlds (Bad Astronaut album), an album by Bad Astronaut
 "War of Worlds", a 2003 song by Rage from Soundchaser

Other uses
 The War of the Worlds (board game), a 1980 board wargame from Task Force
The War of the Worlds II, a 1976 board game by Rand Game Associates
 ROH/NJPW War of the Worlds, an annual professional wrestling event

See also

 
 
 
 Adaptations of The War of the Worlds
 Sherlock Holmes's War of the Worlds, a 1975 sequel to The War of the Worlds by Manly Wade Wellman and Wade Wellman
 Superman: War of the Worlds, a 1999 DC Comics publication
 War of the Worlds: Goliath, a 2012 Malaysian science fiction animation film
 The War of the Worlds: Next Century, a 1981 film by Piotr Szulkin
 War of the Worlds 2: The Next Wave, a 2008 sequel to David Michael Latt's film, directed by C. Thomas Howell
 World war